Charles Hunter Corregan (December 11, 1860 Oswego, New York - June 1946) was an American printer and politician.

Life
In 1898, he ran for New York Attorney General on the Socialist Labor ticket, but was defeated.

In 1900 and 1928, he ran for Governor of New York on the Socialist Labor ticket, but was defeated.

He was nominated for U.S. President in 1904 by the Socialist Labor Party of America.

Notes 
CHARLES H. CORREGAN Obit in NYT on June 20, 1946 (subscription required)

1860 births
1946 deaths
American Marxists
Candidates in the 1904 United States presidential election
20th-century American politicians
Politicians from Oswego, New York
Socialist Labor Party of America presidential nominees
Socialist Labor Party of America politicians from New York (state)